Lipotriches rustica is a species of bee in the genus Lipotriches, of the family Halictidae.

References
 http://www.atlashymenoptera.net/page.asp?id=137
 https://www.academia.edu/7390502/AN_UPDATED_CHECKLIST_OF_BEES_OF_SRI_LANKA_WITH_NEW_RECORDS

Halictidae
Insects described in 1875